Eban Hyams has played professionally in the Australian National Basketball League (NBL) and that country's Waratah League, part of the second division Australian Basketball Association (ABA). He is the first ever player of Indian origin to play in ULEB competitions.

Early life
Hyams was born in Pune, India, to Jewish Indian parents. He moved to Australia at a young age and began playing basketball while attending school there.

A member of the Bene Israeli community, Eban is Jewish and holds Israeli citizenship. His mother is Marilyn Hyams and his father was Erick Isaac Hyams, a well known singer and guitarist for the Indian band Sweet Slag in the late 1970s and early 1980s.

Following his father's death in 1989, he attended boarding school where he excelled in sports. In 1996, his mother remarried and the family moved to Sydney. Earning a scholarship to attend Saint John Paul College in Sydney, Eban was named captain of his school and was introduced to basketball, eventually being selected to the New South Wales Combined Catholic Colleges (NSW CCC) state tryouts.

Professional career

Breakout in Australia

Eban starred for the Sydney-based Penrith Panthers of the Waratah League, part of the second division Australian Basketball Association, from 1999 through 2002, averaging 27 points, 6 rebounds and 9 assists per game.

US Junior College

He spent 2002 through 2004 playing junior college basketball in Georgia, first for the College of Coastal Georgia, then a junior college but now playing in the NAIA, and then Georgia Perimeter College in the NJCAA.

Return to Australia

Following his time in the US, Eban returned to the Australian ABA with the Hornsby Spiders for the 2005 season.

That year Eban also broke out as "Do It All" on the AND1 Mixtape Tour, averaging 18 points and 5 rebounds during streetball exhibition's Asia Pacific circuit.

Embracing his Jewish heritage, he also took part in the 2005 Maccabiah Games in Israel, leading his Australian basketball team to a fourth-place finish.

The following year, Eban played for the ABA's Sydney Comets before moving to the expansion Singapore Slingers of the first division National Basketball League, becoming the first Indian player to complete in that league and earning a place on both the International All-Star and Rookie All-Star teams.

Returning to the ABA with the Bankstown Bruins the following year, Eban excelled, averaging 20 points per game, and earned a three-year contract with Israeli powerhouse Galil Elyon Goba.

Israel, injury and illness

Eban broke his hand in 2008 while visiting his mother and sister in Sydney. Due to a misdiagnosis, it was eight months before he could play again at a professional level and he successfully sued for medical negligence.

Returning to form in 2008 and 2009 with the Waratah League's Manly Warringah Sea Eagles, Eban averaged 23 points a game and earned a place on the Hoopdreamz Great White Sharks, the Australian basketball contingent at the Goodwill Games in Philippines.

In 2011, he travelled to India to train with the India national basketball team ahead of the September 2011 FIBA Asia Championship. Immediately prior to the championships, however, he contracted Dengue fever and, after a period of hospitalisation, required three months of bed rest to recover.

NBA outreach role
Prior to his illness, Eban had been working with the NBA on Indian basketball outreach, and following his recovering in early 2012 was hired by the league as its Manager of Basketball Operations India to support and promoting basketball and the league there. Based in Mumbai, he assists in the administration of the Mahindra NBA Challenge amongst other basketball skills development and health education programs.

Return to the US

In June 2013, Eban returned to the United States intending to play professionally during the 2013–2014 season. He was invited to the NBA Development League National Invitational Tryouts in New York City on 15 June 2013 where he competed with other NBA D-League hopefuls for a roster spot. In October 2013, Eban was invited to try out individually for four D-League franchises: the Tulsa 66ers based in Tulsa, Oklahoma (affiliated with the Oklahoma City Thunder); the Reno Bighorns based in Reno, Nevada (affiliated with the Sacramento Kings); the Los Angeles D-Fenders based in Los Angeles, California (owned by the Los Angeles Lakers); and the Texas Legends based in Frisco, Texas (affiliated with the Dallas Mavericks).

He played for the India masters basketball team in the 2017 Maccabiah Games.

Personal life
Eban has been closely associated with Krishna Shroff the daughter of Bollywood star Jackie Shroff and sister of Tiger Shroff. They met each other through a common friend and ever since they have been spotted having happy time dating and vacationing together.

See also
 List of Jewish basketball players

References

External links
 draftexpress.com: Eban Hyams Profile
 Australiabasketball.com: Eban Hyams Profile
 Euroleage: Eban Hyams Profile
 Hoopistani: Eban Hyams index

1981 births
Living people
Australian men's basketball players
Australian people of Indian-Jewish descent
Basketball players from Maharashtra
Bene Israel
Competitors at the 2005 Maccabiah Games
Hapoel Galil Elyon players
Indian men's basketball players
Israeli men's basketball players
Israeli Basketball Premier League players
Israeli people of Indian-Jewish descent
Jewish Australian sportspeople
Jewish Israeli sportspeople
Jewish men's basketball players
Junior college men's basketball players in the United States
Point guards
Shooting guards
Singapore Slingers players